The Heron Pond Swan Lake Trail is a  long hiking trail in Grand Teton National Park in the U.S. state of Wyoming. From the Hermitage Point trailhead, a number of trails include short loop hikes around Heron Pond and Swan Lake and a longer hike of  one-way connects Colter Bay Village with Jackson Lake Lodge. The trails are over easy terrain and provide excellent wildlife viewing opportunities.

See also
List of hiking trails in Grand Teton National Park

References

Hiking trails of Grand Teton National Park